Sudha Bhuchar (born ) is a Tanzanian-born British Asian actor, playwright, and co-founder of the Tamasha Theatre Company. She is best known for Tamasha's Balti Kings (1999), A Fine Balance (2005), The Trouble with Asian Men (2005), and My Name Is... (2014) as well as numerous screenplays for television and film. Bhuchar's playwriting and producing work focuses on the stories of British Asians with the goal of attracting culturally and ethnically diverse audiences. She has been called "one of Britain's most successful artistic theatre directors and well-established actors" by Asian Culture Vulture online magazine.

Early life and education 
Bhuchar was born in Tanga, Tanzania, to Indian parents. She identifies as British Asian and spent her childhood traveling back and forth between East Africa and India. When Bhuchar was 11 years old, the family moved to England, living in King's Lynn in Norfolk for a year and then moving to London, where she went to school in Fulham. She describes herself as "a chronically shy teenager" and focused academically on science and maths, graduating with a bachelor's degree in Maths and Sociology from Roehampton Institute (now known as University of Roehampton).  Bhuchar credits her first interest with theatre to attending the performance of Tara Arts, a South Asian cultural entertainment group, at a Diwali celebration in 1979. She joined the group to connect with other young British Asians.

She lives in London with her husband and sons.

Professional life

Tamasha Theatre Company

In 1989, Bhuchar and director Kristine Landon-Smith founded Tamasha Theatre Company with the mission of popularizing Asian art into the British mainstream culture, diversifying narratives, and encouraging developing artists from ethnic minorities. At Tamasha, Bhuchar has worked as a playwright, actor, and co-Artistic Director. In a 1999 interview with The Guardian, Bhuchar explained that casting opportunities for Asian actors in England are limited and "unimaginative".

According to Bhuchar in a 2014 interview with London Calling cultural review, Tamasha is a "political company" that encourages "diversity in the arts, representation on the stages, [and] writers from backgrounds which don't normally birth artists and writers".

Bhuchar and Landon-Smith jointly won the 2005 Asian Women of Achievement Awards for Arts and Culture and the 2010 First Women Award in the Tourism and Leisure Category.

In 2015, Bhuchar retired from her co-Artistic Director position at Tamasha and founded a new theatre company, Bhuchar Boulevard, in 2015.

Bhuchar Boulevard

In 2015, after leaving Tamasha Theatre Company, Bhuchar founded Bhuchar Boulevard with the goal of continuing to diversify British theatre by featuring more artists of color and challenging its audience to more critically and empathetically examine their surrounding communities.  The title of the theatre company is a nod to Bhuchar's "global family" and their efforts to push for a sense of belonging and recognition in mainstream Western culture and is publicly funded by Arts Council England.

Bhuchar Boulevard creates new plays- most recently, Child of the Divide (2017) and Golden Hearts (2014). It also combines activism for diversifying arts and other public causes, such as with Bhuchar's work with Golden Hearts and its 2016 partnership with East London Genes & Health to prevent premature heart failure among Asian men.

As Artistic Director of Bhuchar Boulevard, Sudha Bhuchar also works as a commissioned playwright. She most recently collaborated with Tamasha and Paines Plough Theatre Companies, writing a collection of monologues entitled Come To Where I'm From (2017).

TV and radio 
Bhuchar has appeared in TV soap operas EastEnders and Coronation Street, and created the role of solicitor Usha Gupta in radio soap The Archers.

In 2016, she appeared on BBC Radio 4's Great Lives, nominating Indian actress Zohra Sehgal.

Playwriting and screenwriting selected works

Performance experience

References

External links

1960s births
Living people
British actresses
People from Tanga, Tanzania
British people of Indian descent
British dramatists and playwrights
Year of birth uncertain
British screenwriters
Alumni of the University of Roehampton
British theatre people
People from Tanga Region